The 1st constituency of Jász-Nagykun-Szolnok County is one of the single member constituencies of the National Assembly, the national legislature of Hungary. The constituency standard abbreviation: Jász-Nagykun-Szolnok 01. OEVK.

Since 2018, it has been represented by Mária Kállai of the Fidesz–KDNP party alliance.

Geography
The 1st constituency is located in western part of Jász-Nagykun-Szolnok County.

The constituency borders with 2nd constituency to the north, 3rd constituency to the east, 4th constituency to the southeast, 2nd constituency of Bács-Kiskun County and 12th constituency of Pest County to the west.

List of municipalities
The constituency includes the following municipalities:

History
The 1st constituency of Jász-Nagykun-Szolnok County was created in 2011 and contained parts of the pre-2011 abolished constituencies of 3rd and 4th of this County. Its borders have not changed since its creation.

Members
The constituency was first represented by Ildikó Bene of the Fidesz from 2014 to 2018. Mária Kállai of the Fidesz was elected in 2018 and she was re-elected in 2022.

Election result

2022 election

2018 election

2014 election

References

Jasz-Nagykun-Szolnok 1st